A Health Care Spending Account (HCSA), or Healthcare Spending Account (HSA) is a type of flexible employee benefit program in Canada that aims to provide more flexibility than a traditional health plan. As a supplemental program, it covers items that are not normally part of the traditional plan. Generally these plans include a fixed amount per employee available to be claimed, which makes budgeting for them easier for employers. Expenses that can be claimed against an HCSA are regulated by the Canada Revenue Agency.

Covered & Non-covered Expenses

HCSA covers expenses connected with health, vision and dental care for employees, their spouses or any dependents (children) qualified by the Canada Revenue Agency. Expenses related to cosmetic surgery, hair removal/regeneration, non-prescription lenses or over-the-counter drugs without an actual prescription signed by registered medical staff, etc. cannot be paid using a Health Care Spending Account.

References

Healthcare in Canada